Chirk AAA F.C. is a Welsh football team based in Chirk, Wales. They compete in the Cymru North. They were previously in the Premier division of the Welsh National League since their relegation after one season in the Cymru Alliance.

Their reserve team plays in the FAW Reserve League (North East)

History 
For a full history see; List of Chirk AAA FC seasons

Chirk, along with other local teams Wrexham, Oswestry and Druids, became founder members of the Welsh Football Association in the same year as their formation.

Chirk’s early teams were formed mainly from employees from both Chirk Castle and Black Park Colliery. Chirk played friendly fixtures against other local teams and it was not until October 1877 that Chirk competed in a competitive fixture, although archive information from the Football Association suggests that the club entered the 1885–86 FA Cup, losing in the first round to Burslem Port Vale 3 – 0.

Albert Lockley, the Welsh international forward who played for Chirk in the late 19th century, was the great grandfather of actor Ralf Little. 

Billy Meredith started his football career at the club before playing for Manchester City and Manchester United.

Honours
Taken from the Chirk AAA website
Welsh Cup Winners: (5) 1886–87, 1887–88, 1889–90, 1891–92, 1893–94
Welsh Cup Runners-Up: (1) 1892–93
Welsh Amateur Cup Winners: (3) 1958–58, 1959–60, 1962–63
Welsh Amateur Cup Runners-Up: (2) 1951–52, 1954–55
FAW Trophy Winners: (1) 2016–17
FAW Trophy Runners-Up: (1) 2013–14
The Combination Champions: (1) : 1899–1900
Welsh National League First Division Champions: (8) 1947–48, 1949–50, 1951–52, 1958–59, 1959–60, 1960–61, 1983–84, 2012–13
Welsh National League Second Division Champions: (2) 1978–79, 1984–85
North Wales Alliance Cup Winners: (2) 1919–20, 1920–21
Welsh National League Premier Division Cup Winners: (4) 1988–89, 1990–91, 1998–99, 2003–04
Welsh National League Division 1 League Cup Winners: (1) 1953–54
Welsh National League Division 2 League Cup Winners: (4) 1975–76, 1976–77, 1978–79, 1984–85
North East Wales FA Junior (Horace Wynne) Cup  (1) 1978–79
Carlsberg Pub and Club Cup Cymru Winners: (1) 1996–97
Ardal NE League Champions: (1) 2021–22

Current squad

References

External links
Club website

Football clubs in Wales
Football clubs in Wrexham
Welsh National League (Wrexham Area) Premier Division clubs
Sport in Wrexham County Borough
Association football clubs established in 1876
1876 establishments in Wales
Cymru Alliance clubs
Chirk
Mining association football teams in Wales
Ardal Leagues clubs
North Wales Alliance League clubs
Cymru North clubs